Shcherbachov, feminine: Shcherbachova is a Russian-language surname. Notable people with the name include:

Nikolai Shcherbachov (1853–1922), Russian composer and pianist
Vladimir Shcherbachov (1889–1952), Russian/Soviet composer and teacher
Lyubov Shcherbachova, birth name of Lyubov Yanovska (1861–1933), Ukrainian writer and feminist

See also
Shcherbachev
Shcherbakov (disambiguation)Shcherbakov

Russian-language surnames